Loughborough Lightning were an English women's Twenty20 cricket team based at  Loughborough University. They were formed in 2016 to compete in the inaugural season of the Women's Cricket Super League. They primarily played their home matches at the Haslegrave Ground. They were coached by Rob Taylor and were captained by Georgia Elwiss. The team was partnered with Loughborough University. Together with the netball team and the women's rugby union team, the cricket team was one of three women's sports teams based at Loughborough University that used the Loughborough Lightning name. In 2020, following reforms to the structure of women's domestic cricket, some elements of the Loughborough Lightning were retained for a new team, named just Lightning and representing a broader region.

History

2016–2019: Women's Cricket Super League

Loughborough Lightning were formed in 2016 to compete in the new Women's Cricket Super League, partnering with Loughborough University and playing across the Midlands. In the first season of the WCSL, the Lightning finished 3rd in the group stage, progressing to the semi-final, where they were beaten by eventual runners-up Western Storm. The following season, 2017, saw Loughborough miss out on Finals Day, finishing 4th with two wins. 

2018 was Loughborough Lightning's most successful season, as they topped the group with 7 wins from 10 games, progressing straight to the final. However, they were defeated by Surrey Stars by 66 runs after the Stars' Lizelle Lee hit a century. Lightning bowler Kirstie Gordon was the leading wicket-taker of the tournament, with 17. In 2019, the Lightning again progressed to Finals Day after finishing 2nd in the group with 7 victories, but were beaten in the semi-final by the Southern Vipers. Following this season, women's cricket in England was restructured and Loughborough Lightning were disbanded as part of the reforms; however they survived in spirit for a new team, Lightning, who represented a larger area, but retained some of their players.

Home grounds

Players
Final squad, 2019 season
 No. denotes the player's squad number, as worn on the back of their shirt.
  denotes players with international caps.

Overseas players
  Dane van Niekerk – South Africa (2016)
  Ellyse Perry – Australia (2016–2017)
  Sophie Devine – New Zealand (2016, 2018)
  Kristen Beams – Australia (2017)
  Elyse Villani – Australia (2017–2018)
  Rachael Haynes – Australia (2018)
  Mignon du Preez – South Africa (2019)
  Chamari Atapattu – Sri Lanka (2019)
  Hayley Matthews – West Indies (2019)

Seasons

Statistics

Overall Results

 Abandoned matches are counted as NR (no result)
 Win or loss by super over or boundary count are counted as tied.

Teamwise Result summary

Records 

Highest team total: 174/7, v Southern Vipers on 4 August, 2018.
Lowest team total: 97, v Southern Vipers on 14 August, 2016.
Highest individual score: 91, Dane van Niekerk v Surrey Stars on 12 August, 2016.
Best individual bowling analysis: 3/10, Jenny Gunn v Lancashire Thunder on 22 July, 2018.
Most Runs: 636 in 31 matches, Amy Jones.
Most wickets: 28 wickets in 21 matches, Kirstie Gordon.

References

Loughborough Lightning (women's cricket)
Women's Cricket Super League teams
2016 establishments in England
cricket
Women
Cricket clubs established in 2016